Diploperlini is a tribe of springflies in the family Perlodidae. There are about 13 genera and more than 30 described species in Diploperlini.

Genera
These 13 genera belong to the tribe Diploperlini:

 Afroperlodes Miron & Zwick, 1973
 Baumannella Stark & Stewart, 1985
 Bulgaroperla Raušer, 1966
 Cultus Ricker, 1952
 Diploperla Needham & Claassen, 1925
 Hemimelaena Klapálek, 1907
 Kogotus Ricker, 1952
 Osobenus Ricker, 1952
 Ostrovus Ricker, 1952
 Pictetiella Illies, 1966
 Remenus Ricker, 1952
 Rickera Jewett, 1954
 Stavsolus Ricker, 1952

References

Further reading

External links

Perlodidae
Articles created by Qbugbot